Heteroperipatus is a genus of Central American velvet worms in the Peripatidae family. The number of legs in this genus varies within species as well as among species and ranges from 26 pairs (in H. clarki) to 32 pairs (in H. engelhardi). This genus is viviparous, with mothers supplying nourishment to their embryos through a placenta.

Species
The genus contains the following two species:
 Heteroperipatus clarki (Dunn, 1943)
 Heteroperipatus engelhardi Zilch, 1954

References

Onychophoran genera
Onychophorans of tropical America